Albemarle Barracks is a British Army barracks located  south of Stamfordham, Northumberland and  west of Newcastle-upon-Tyne, Tyne and Wear.

History
The barracks were established, on the site of the former RAF Ouston airbase, in 1970. The barracks were occupied by Junior Signalmans Wing of 11 Signal Regiment in the 1970s, before they were handed over to the Junior Infantry Battalion in the mid-1980s. The barracks were home to 39 Regiment Royal Artillery from 1995 until that regiment disbanded there in February 2015. On 13 July 2015 3rd Regiment Royal Horse Artillery started transferring from its former base in Bergen-Hohne Garrison, Germany. Its runways are used by Northumbria Police for driver training and as a stop-off point for nuclear warheads convoys en route via road between RNAD Coulport and AWE Aldermaston as part of the UK Trident programme.

Current units
3rd Regiment, Royal Horse Artillery

References

A
Barracks in England